Mehr (مهر) is a name of Persian origin that may refer to:

Given name or epithet
 Mehr-un-Nissa, name given at birth to Nur Jahan (1577-1645), Empress Consort of the Mughal Empire
 Mehr Abdul Haq (1915–1995), Pakistani linguist
 Mehr Chand Mahajan (1889–1967), former Chief Justice of the Supreme Court of India
 Mehr Hassan, American actress, model, and classical dancer
 Mehr Jesia (born 1968), Indian supermodel

Surname
 Farhang Mehr (born 1923), Zoroastrian scholar and politician
 Haik Hovsepian Mehr (1945–1994), Iranian bishop
 Mariella Mehr (1947–2022), Swiss writer
 Nathaniel Mehr, British journalist
 Ghulam Rasool Mehr (1895 - 1971), Pakistani scholar and political activist

See also
 Mehr (disambiguation)

Persian words and phrases
Persian-language surnames
Surnames of Swiss origin